Christopher Bernhardt Fox (September 25, 1888 – February 12, 1968) served in the California State Assembly for the 40th district from 1923 to 1925. During World War I he also served in the United States Army.

References

United States Army personnel of World War I
Republican Party members of the California State Assembly
1888 births
1968 deaths